Narimani-ye Olya (also Romanized as Narīmānī-ye ‘Olyā) is a village in Abravan Rural District, Razaviyeh District, Mashhad County, Razavi Khorasan Province, Iran. At the 2006 census, its population was 1,914, in 440 families.

References 

Populated places in Mashhad County